The Secret Tent is a 1956 crime film directed by Don Chaffey. It stars Donald Gray and Andrée Melly and was made at Shepperton Studios.

Plot
Respectable wife Ruth attempts to conceal her secret past as a criminal from neighbours and from her husband Chris. However, when a neighbour is burgled and Ruth mysteriously disappears, she becomes the police's prime suspect. Husband Chris searches the city for Ruth, in hopes of proving her innocence.

Cast
Donald Gray as Chris Martyn
Andrée Melly as Ruth Martyn
Jean Anderson as Mrs. Martyn
Sonia Dresdel as Miss Mitchum-Browne
Andrew Cruickshank as Inspector Thornton
 Dinah Ann Rogers as Sally
Peter Hammond as Smith
Conrad Phillips as Sergeant
 Gareth Tandy as Philip

Critical reception
Sky Movies wrote, "talented director Don Chaffey, who later made The Man Upstairs, Jason and the Argonauts and A Jolly Bad Fellow treats novelettish material with some flair in this story of a former `bad girl' whose past threatens her present happiness."

References

External links

1956 films
Films directed by Don Chaffey
British crime drama films
1956 crime drama films
1950s English-language films
1950s British films
British black-and-white films